Tamil Nadu State Highway 26 (SH-26) is a State Highway maintained by the Highways Department of Government of Tamil Nadu. It connects Trichy with Mimisal in the southeastern part of Tamil Nadu.

Route
The route is from Trichy-Mimisal, via Pudukkottai and Aranthangi.

See also 
 Highways of Tamil Nadu

References 

State highways in Tamil Nadu
Road transport in Tiruchirappalli